The fourth season of Love Games: Bad Girls Need Love Too premiered on November 5, 2012, and ran for nine episodes. It is hosted by Bad Girls Club alumni Tanisha Thomas, and is also the first season to feature girls from the same season and to feature a replacement as a cast member.

Format
Alumni from previous seasons of Bad Girls Club are "looking for the man of their dreams." For season four,  Three "bad girls" have a choice of 14 bachelors to explore love, friendships, etc. Each week features a variety of challenges. The "bad girls" battle it out and compete to be the "HBIC" - Head Bad Girl In Charge. Instead of season 1 with each "bad girl" choosing who is up for elimination, the "HBIC" chooses who is up for elimination. This season, the HBIC gets a card that gives her power that causes twists throughout the game. Also, this season, two alumni bad boys have come back to compete for love, Taylor from Love Games 2 and Joey from Love Games 3. The girls competing this season are Amy, Danni, and Camilla from season eight, making this the first season of Love Games to feature three girls from the same Bad Girls Club season, as well as the first to feature a replacement Bad Girl as a cast member.

Cast

"Bad Girls"

Contestants

Game History

 The contestant is the Bad Girl
 The contestant is a male
 This contestant was the HBIC
 This contestant was placed on a date by the HBIC
 This contestant was chosen to go on a second date by one of the girls
 This contestant was chosen to go on a second date but was also in the bottom 3
 This contestant was put in the bottom 3 by the HBIC
 This contestant was eliminated
 This contestant was eliminated by the other girls but then saved by the HBIC
 This contestant was place on a date by the HBIC but was also immune due to a previous power
 This contestant was originally put in the bottom 3 by the HBIC, but was swapped by the HBIC for another guy to be up for elimination

Episodes

References

External links
 

2012 American television seasons
2013 American television seasons